This is a list of theatres and stages in Hamburg.

The city of Hamburg, Germany, is home to several theatres, stages and related cultural institutions and entertainment venues. In 2009, 31 theatres, 6 music halls, and 10 cabarets  were located in Hamburg proper. This list contains the most famous or well-regarded organizations.

Theatres and stages

Theatres 
In 2005/6, 4.2 mil. visits to a theatre were counted in Hamburg, 2,380 visits per 1000 inhabitants, so Hamburg had more visits than Bremen (920) and Berlin (920). The average for the German states was 420 visits.

Stages

See also  

 List of castles in Hamburg
 List of churches in Hamburg

Notes

References

External links 

 Theatres and Stages in Hamburg, Hamburg Tourismus GmbH 

 
Culture in Hamburg
Hamburg
Hamburg-related lists
Hamburg